KNID may refer to:

 the ICAO code for Naval Air Weapons Station China Lake, near Ridgecrest, California, United States
 KNID (FM), a radio station (107.1 FM) licensed to North Enid, Oklahoma, United States
 the Vermicious knid, a hostile shape-shifting alien race
 The Vermicious Knid, a now-defunct indie rock band
 Kirby: Nightmare in Dream Land, a video game for the Game Boy Advance